The play-offs of the 2015 Fed Cup Europe/Africa Zone Group III were the final stages of the Group III zonal competition involving teams from Europe and Africa. Using the positions determined in their pools, the thirteen teams faced off to determine their placing in the 2015 Fed Cup Europe/Africa Zone Group III. The top two teams advanced to Fed Cup Europe/Africa Zone Group II.

Promotional play-offs 
The first placed teams of each pool were drawn in head-to-head rounds. The winner of each round advanced to Group II in 2016.

Lithuania vs. Moldova

Greece vs. Denmark

5th to 8th play-offs 
The second placed teams of each pool were drawn in head-to-head rounds to find the equal fifth and seventh placed teams.

Armenia vs. Norway

Cyprus vs. Macedonia

9th to 12th play-offs 
The third placed teams of each pool were drawn in head-to-head rounds to find the equal ninth and eleventh placed teams.

Iceland vs. Namibia

Montenegro vs. Algeria

Final placements 

  and  advanced to Europe/Africa Group II in 2016.

References

External links 
 Fed Cup website

P3